X Marks the Spot was a British radio quiz and panel game, broadcast on BBC Radio 4 between 1998 and 2006. It could be likened to be a more light-hearted version of Round Britain Quiz. It was presented by the comedian and author Pete McCarthy until his death in October 2004. The writer and broadcaster David Stafford took over the reins from series 7.

Concept

The game consisted of three celebrities identifying four places around the United Kingdom, as well as a supplementary question set in those locations. The four locations join up to form a giant X on the map. Where the two lines cross, a treasure is (metaphorically) hidden. The panel have to identify the treasure using up to four lines of a riddle gained by answering the supplementary questions correctly. Unlike the UK television programme Treasure Hunt, there is no actual buried treasure and the panel do not have to fetch it, merely identify it.

The format, created by John Higgs, encouraged the team of three contestants to co-operate rather than compete against each other, and was designed to encourage the telling of interesting anecdotes and digressions. It was inspired in part by the book Lights out for the Territory by Iain Sinclair, in which the author walks across London and at one point takes a route that marks an 'X' across the ground. Another influence was an interview with Paul Devereux, the editor of The Ley Hunter magazine, a periodical devoted to ley lines and other earth mysteries. Devereux had eventually concluded that most ley lines were nothing more than co-incidence, and commented that it was remarkably easy to draw a line on a map that crossed a number of interesting places.

The questions were written by David J. Bodycombe (and, for one series, treasure hunt author Dan James) and the programme was an independent production by Hewland International for BBC Radio 4.

External links

BBC Radio 4 programmes
British radio game shows
1990s British game shows
2000s British game shows
1998 radio programme debuts
2006 radio programme endings
Radio game shows with incorrect disambiguation